The 1949/1950 News of the World Snooker Tournament was a professional snooker tournament sponsored by the News of the World. The tournament was won by Joe Davis with Sidney Smith finishing in second place. It was the first News of the World Tournament, a tournament that ran until 1959.

Format
The 1949/1950 event was a round-robin snooker tournament and was played from 10 October 1949 to 21 January 1950. All matches were played at Leicester Square Hall in London. There were 8 competitors and a total of 28 matches. The competitors were Joe Davis, Walter Donaldson, George Chenier, Horace Lindrum, Sidney Smith, Peter Mans and Albert Brown. Each match lasted three days and was the best of 37 frames. There was a qualifying competition prior to the main event. This involved 4 players in a round-robin tournament with the winner, Albert Brown, advancing to the main event. 1949 World Snooker Champion Fred Davis did not enter as he objected to the matches being over only three days rather than the normal six.

Each player was given a handicap at the start of the tournament. The handicaps were: Davis: -7, Donaldson: 0, Chenier, Lindrum and Smith: 13, Pulman: 14, Mans: 16 and Brown: 19. The player with the higher handicap received a start in each frame, being the difference between the two handicaps. Thus Brown received a 3-point start in his match against Mans.

Results
The two top-seeded players met in the first match. Joe Davis beat Walter Donaldson, won a tough match; taking a winning 19–16 lead in the final session. In the second match Albert Brown, receiving a 26-point start each frame, led Joe Davis 18–6 after two days and won comfortably.

Going into his last match Albert Brown seemed the likely winner of the tournament. He and Joe Davis had won 5 matches out of 6 but Brown had an 8 frame lead. This meant that if Brown won his last match 19–18, Davis would need to win his last match 28–9 to win the event. However Brown lost his last match, against Horace Lindrum, which meant that Davis only needed to win his match against George Chenier to win the tournament. In the next match Sidney Smith won 26–11, overtaking Brown in the standings and meaning that Smith would win the tournament if Davis lost. Davis took a 19–4 lead against Chenier to guarantee the £500 first prize with Smith in second place and Brown third.

Joe Davis scored the first century of the tournament on 8 November in his match against John Pulman. Pulman potted a red before Davis cleared the table with a break of 130. Davis scored a break of exactly 100 against Sidney Smith on 3 January. George Chenier scored a break of 107 on 19 January in his match against Davis.

Table

The positions were determined firstly by the number of matches won (MW) and, in the event of a tie, the number of frames won (FW). Albert Brown won an additional £50 for winning the qualifying competition.

Qualifying
The qualifying tournament was played from 19 September to 8 October 1949. These matches were also played at Leicester Square Hall in London. As in the main event, each match lasted three days and was the best of 37 frames. Albert Brown and Alec Brown each won their first two matches which meant that the final match, between the two, would decide the winner. Albert Brown won a close match 20–17. Alec had led 13–11 at the start of the final day. Conrad Stanbury conceded his match against John Barrie because of illness. Barrie was leading 8–4 at the time. Barrie played a two-day exhibition match against Peter Mans instead.

References

News of the World Snooker Tournament
News of the World Snooker Tournament
News of the World Snooker Tournament
News of the World Snooker Tournament
News of the World Snooker Tournament
News of the World Snooker Tournament
News of the World Snooker Tournament